Anthony Lowther may refer to:

Anthony Lowther (of Marske) (1641 – 1693), Member of Parliament for Appleby 1679–1681, ancestor of the Lowther Baronets of Marske
Anthony Lowther (of Lowther) (1694 – 1741), Member of Parliament for Cockermouth 1721–1722 and Westmorland 1722–1741, third son of the 1st Viscount Lonsdale
Anthony Lowther, Viscount Lowther (1896 – 1949), eldest son of the 6th Earl of Lonsdale